The Chief of Defence Staff is the professional head of the Trinidad and Tobago Defence Force. He is responsible for the administration and the operational control of the military. The current chief is Air Vice Marshall Darryl Daniel who was appointed on 25 March 2019, Air Commodore and promoted to Air Vice Marshall effective November 01,2020 . Unlike other Caribbean nations, the chief is not called the more common "Chief of Staff". This is due to the strong ties Trinidad and Tobago had to the British equivalent during the establishment of the TTDF.

List of officeholders

References 

 

 
Trinidad and Tobago